The Sign of the Cross is a 1914 American drama silent film directed by Frederick A. Thomson based on the 1895 play by Wilson Barrett. The film stars William Farnum, Rosina Henley, Sheridan Block, Morgan Thorpe, Ethel Grey Terry, Lila Barclay and George Majeroni. The film was released on December 21, 1914, by Paramount Pictures.

Plot
Rome, 64 A.D. When the emperor Nero renews the persecutions against Christians, the prefect Marco Superbo fears for the life of Mercia, a Christian with whom he is in love. The woman, however, is arrested and the emperor refuses to pardon her unless she renounces her faith. Mercia not only rejects the offer that is communicated to her by Marco but, before entering the arena, also converts Marco who, together with her, faces death.

Cast 
William Farnum as Marcus Superbus
Rosina Henley as Mercia
Sheridan Block as Nero
Morgan Thorpe as Favius
Ethel Grey Terry as Berenice 
Lila Barclay as Poppaea
George Majeroni as Tigellinus 
Ogden Childe as Stephanus 
Ethel Phillips as Dacia
Charles E. Vernon as Glabrio
Rienzi De Cordova as Philodemus

See also 
 The Sign of the Cross (1932 film)
 The Sign of the Cross (1895 play)

Footnotes

References 
 Barrett, Wilson, The Sign of the Cross, J.B. Lippincott Company, (Philadelphia), 1896: Barrett's novelized version of his play.

External links 
 

1914 films
Silent American drama films
1910s English-language films
1914 drama films
Paramount Pictures films
American films based on plays
American black-and-white films
Films set in the 1st century
Films set in the Roman Empire
Depictions of Nero on film
Cultural depictions of Poppaea Sabina
Films set in Rome
Films about gladiatorial combat
American silent feature films
Films directed by Frederick A. Thomson
1910s American films